Leptohoplia testaceipennis is a species of shining leaf chafer in the family of beetles known as Scarabaeidae. It is found in North America.

References

Further reading

 

Rutelinae
Articles created by Qbugbot
Beetles described in 1935